Karl Håkan Einar Lindahl (10 March 1874 – 12 April 1930) was a Finnish architect of Swedish origin.

Life and career
Born in Jönköping, Lindahl studied architecture at the Helsinki Polytechnic Institute, graduating in 1898. Beginning in 1900, he practised as an architect in Helsinki. Initially he was an early proponent of the National Romantic or Art nouveau style, for many years in partnership with Walter Thomé. Then, like many of his contemporaries, he changed to a neo-classical style. His work includes several public buildings, residences in Helsinki and some country houses in Suvisaaristo, but also many industrial buildings.

In 1907, Lindahl was sent with veterinarian Oskar von Hellens on a fact-finding tour of foreign abattoirs to enable incorporation of best practices in the new Helsinki slaughterhouse.

He died in Helsinki.

Selected works

 (with Walter Thomé) Oulu Market Hall (1901)
 (with Walter Thomé) Polytechnic Students' Union, also called the Sampo Building, Lönnrotinkatu 29, Helsinki (1903)
 (with Walter Thomé) Enso Gutzeit factory headquarters, Kotka (1903)
 (with Walter Thomé) Headquarters of Otava publishing company, Uudenmaankatu 10, Helsinki (1905)
 Söderkulla mansion, Söderkulla, now part of Sipoo (1908)
 Helsinki Workers' House, Paasivuorenkatu 5 A (1908, 1924)
 Gunnarsberg villa, Grankulla (1910)
 Finnish business centre in Viipuri (1911)
 (with Walter Thomé) Headquarters of Suomi insurance company, Eteläesplanadi 2, Helsinki (1912), now headquarters of UPM
 School, Liedakkala (1915)
 Hahkiala estate at Hauho (1916) 
 Sugar refinery, Salo (1919)
 Finlayson factory power plant, Forssa (1921)
 Lindö estate at Ekenäs (1923)
 Industrial and town buildings including a school, Varkaus (1924)
 Ahlström pulp mill, Karhula, now part of Kotka (1927)
 Korkeakoski power plant (1927)

References

Further reading

 Moorhouse, Jonathan & Carapetian, Michael & Ahtola-Moorhouse, Leena: Helsinki Jugendstil architecture, 1895–1915. Helsinki: Otava, 1987. 

1874 births
1930 deaths
20th-century Finnish architects
People from Jönköping
Art Nouveau architects
Finnish people of Swedish descent
Swedish emigrants to Finland